The 1998–99 George Mason Patriots Men's basketball team represents George Mason University during the 1998–99 NCAA Division I men's basketball season. This was the 33rd season for the program, the second under head coach Jim Larrañaga. The Patriots played their home games at the Patriot Center in Fairfax, Virginia.

Honors and awards 
Colonial Athletic Association Player of the Year
 George Evans

Colonial Athletic Association All-Conference Team
 George Evans
 Jason Miskiri

Colonial Athletic Association Defensive Player of the Year
 George Evans

Colonial Athletic Association Coach of the Year
 Jim Larrañaga

Roster

Player statistics

Schedule and results

|-
!colspan=12 style=| Non-conference regular season

|-
!colspan=12 style=|CAA regular season

|-
!colspan=12 style=|1999 CAA tournament

|-
!colspan=12 style=|1999 NCAA tournament

References

George Mason Patriots men's basketball seasons
George Mason
George Mason
George Mason men's basketball
George Mason men's basketball